Dino is a masculine given name which may refer to the following people:

 Dino (fl.m c. 360-340 BC) or Dinon, ancient Greek historian
 Dino (Italian singer) (Eugenio Zambelli, 1948)
 Dino, real name Gilles Benizio, of French comic duo Shirley and Dino
 Dino (footballer, born 1917), full name Oswaldo Rodolfo da Silva, Brazilian football midfielder
 Dino (footballer, born 1978), full name Dino Gonçalo Castro Jorge, Brazilian football defender
 Dino (American singer) (Dean Esposito, born 1963), American DJ, singer-songwriter, and record producer
 Dino Abazović (born 1972), Bosnian sociologist and professor
 Dino Abbrescia (born 1966), Italian actor
 Dino Acconci, member of Hong Kong-based rock band Soler
 Dino Adriano (1943-2018), British businessman
 Dino Agote (born 1996), Chilean footballer
 Dino Alfieri (1886-1966), Italian fascist politician and diplomat
 Dino Andrade (born 1963), American voice actor
 Dino Arslanagić (born 1993), Belgian professional footballer of Bosnian descent
 Dino Asciolla, member of the string group Quartetto Italiano
 Dino Attanasio (born 1925), Belgian author of comics
 Dino Babers (born 1961), American football coach
 Dino Baggio (born 1971), Italian former professional footballer
 Dino Ballacci (1924-2013), Italian football player and manager
 Dino Ballarin (1925-1949), Italian footballer
 Dino Bardot (born 1972), Scottish musician and songwriter
 Dino Barsotti (1903-1985), Italian rower
 Dino Basaldella (1909-1977), Italian sculptor and painter
 Dino Battaglia (1923-1983), Italian comic artist
 Dino Bauk (born 1972), Slovenian lawyer and writer
 Dino Beganovic (born 2004), Swedish-Bosnian racing driver
 Dino Belosevic (born 1985), Croatian kickboxer
 Dino Bergens (born 1969), Dutch-Surinamese basketball player
 Dino Bertolo (born 1953), French racing cyclist
 Dino Beširović (born 1994), Portuguese-born Bosnian professional footballer
 Dino Betti van der Noot (born 1936), Italian jazz composer
 Dino Bevab (born 1993), Bosnian footballer
 Dino Bisanovic (born 1990), Bosnian footballer
 Dino Boffo (born 1952), Italian journalist
 Dino Borgioli (1891-1960), Italian lyric tenor
 Dino Bouterse (born 1972), son of former President of Suriname
 Dino Bovoli (1914-1988), Italian professional footballer and coach
 Dino Bravo (1948-1993), Italian-Canadian professional wrestler and promoter
 Dino Brugioni (1921-2015), American imagery analyst and bomb damage assessor
 Dino Bruni (born 1932), Italian road cyclist
 Dino Butorac (born 1990), Croatian basketball player
 Dino Buzzati (1906-1972), Italian writer and painter
 Dino Campana (1885-1932), Italian visionary poet
 Dino Campanella, member of American rock band Dredg
 Dino Casanova (1967-2002), American professional wrestler
 Dino Cassio (1934-2012), Italian actor and singer
 Dino Castagno (born 1993), Argentine professional footballer
 Dino Cazares (born 1969), guitarist for Divine Heresy and former guitarist for Fear Factory
 Dino Cellini (1914-1978), American gangster of Italian descent
 Dino Chiozza (1912-1972), American MLB player
 Dino Ciani (1941-1974), Italian pianist
 Dino Ciccarelli (born 1960), Canadian retired NHL player
 Dino Cinel, Italian-American historian, professor, and Roman Catholic priest
 Dino Claudio Sanchez, Filipino incumbent politician
 Dino Compagni (c. 1255-1324), Italian historical writer and political figure
 Dino Costa, American radio personality
 Dino Costantini (born 1940), Italian equestrian
 Dino Crescentini (1947-2008), Sammarinese bobsledder
 Dino Daa (born 1984), Filipino professional basketball player
 Dino da Costa (1931–2020), Brazilian-Italian former footballer
 Dino Danelli (1944-2022), American drummer
 Dino De Antoni (1936-2019), Italian Roman Catholic archbishop
 Dino De Poli (1929-2020), Italian lawyer and politician
 Dino De Zordo (born 1937), Italian ski jumper
 Dino Delevski (born 1976), American soccer player of Macedonian descent
 Dino Delmastro (born 1996), Argentine badminton player
 Dino del Garbo (c. 1280-1327), Italian medieval physician and philosopher
 Dino Diana (1883-?), Italian fencer
 Dino Dibra (1975-2000), Australian suspected murderer and a homicide victim
 Dino Di Luca (1903-1991), Italian actor of stage, screen, and television
 Dino Dines (1944-2004), British keyboarder
 Dino Dini (born 1965), creator of football video games
 Dino Djiba (born 1985), Senegalese former professional footballer
 Dino Djulbic (born 1983), Bosnian-Australian footballer
 Dino Dolmagić (born 1994), Serbian footballer
 Dino Don (1925-2007), Italian operatic baritone
 Dino Drpic (born 1981), Croatian professional footballer
 Dino Durbuzovic (born 1956), Bosnian professional football manager and former player
 Dino Duva (born 1958), American boxing promoter
 Dino Dvornik (1964-2008), Croatian singer-songwriter, music producer, actor, and reality television star
 Dino Ebel (born 1966), American baseball coach
 Dino Esposito (born 1965), Italian consultant, author, and MSDN magazine columnist
 Dino Eze (born 1984), Nigerian former footballer
 Dino Falconi (1902-1990), Italian screenwriter and film director
 Dino Fava (born 1977), Italian footballer
 Dino Fazlic (born 1991), German footballer
 Dino Fekaris (born 1945), Greek-American music producer and songwriter
 Dino Felicetti (born 1970), Italian-Canadian retired professional ice hockey player
 Dino Ferari, Italian drummer
 Dino Ferrari (1914-2000), Italian painter
 Dino Ferruzzi (1892-?), Italian equestrian
 Dino Fetscher (born 1988), Welsh actor
 Dino Formaggio (1914-2008), Italian philosopher, art critic, and academic
 Dino Gabriel, Italian-born Anglican bishop of Natal
 Dino Galparoli (born 1957), retired Italian footballer
 Dino Galvani (1890-1960), Italian actor
 Dino Gardner (born 1993), Canadian soccer player
 Dino Gaudio (born 1957), former American college basketball coach
 Dino Gavric (born 1989), Croatian footballer
 Dino Giarrusso (born 1974), Italian television personality and politician
 Dino Gifford (1917-2013), Italian professional footballer
 Dino Gillarduzzi (born 1975), Italian speed skater
 Dino Grandi (1895-1988), 1st Conte di Mordano, Italian Fascist politician
 Dino Hackett (born 1964), former American NFL player
 Dino Halilović (born 1998), Croatian footballer
 Dino Hall (born 1955), former American NFL player
 Dino Hamidović (born 1996), Bosnian handball player
 Dino Hamzić (born 1988), Bosnian professional footballer
 Dino Hotić (born 1995), Slovenian footballer
 Dino Imperial (born 1988), Filipino actor, Club MC, commercial model, and radio DJ
 Dino Innocenti (1913-1971), Italian ice hockey player
 Dino Islamović (born 1994), Swedish footballer
 Dino Jelusić (born 1992), Croatian rock singer, musician, and songwriter
 Dino Kartsonakis (born 1942), pianist who plays Christian-influenced music
 Dino Kessler (born 1966), former Swiss professional ice hockey player
 Dino Klisura (born 1999), Bosnian musician and producer
 Dino Kluk (born 1991), professional Croatian footballer
 Dino Kotopoulis (1932-2020), American artist
 Dino Kovacec (born 1993), Croatian footballer
 Dino Kovacevic (born 1999), Austrian footballer
 Dino Kraspedon (1905-1985), Brazilian author
 Dino Kresinger (born 1982), Croatian footballer
 Dino Lalvani (born 1973), British businessman, chairman, and CEO
 Dino Lamb (born 1998), English rugby union player
 Dino Lanaro (1909-1998), Italian painter
 Dino Lee (born 1993), Taiwanese singer, composer, musician, and actor
 Dino Lenny, Italian DJ, singer, record producer, and record label owner
 Dino Liviero (1938-1970), Italian road racing cyclist
 Dino Lombardi (born 1990), Italian motorcycle racer
 Dino Lopez (born 1969), Canadian retired soccer player
 Dino Lucchetta (born 1968), Italian rowing coxswain
 Dino Maamria (born 1974), Tunisian football manager and former player
 Dino Maiuri (1916-1984), Italian screenwriter, film director, and producer
 Dino Mangiero (born 1958), retired professional American football player
 Dino Marcan (born 1991), Croatian professional tennis player
 Dino Marino (born 1985), former Italian footballer
 Dino Martens (1894-1970), Italian painter and glass artist
 Dino Martin (1920-1999), American professional basketball player and coach
 Dino Martinovic (born 1990), Slovenian footballer
 Dino Mascotto (born 1932), former Canadian professional hockey player and AHL player
 Dino Mattessich, Croatian-American university administrator and former college lacrosse coach and player
 Dino Medjedovic (born 1989), Bosnian footballer
 Dino Melaye (born 1974), Nigerian politician
 Dino Menardi (1923-2014), Italian ice hockey player
 Dino Meneghin (born 1950), Italian former professional basketball player
 Dino Mennillo (born 1975), Australian retired soccer player and current occupational therapist
 Dino Merlin (Edin Dervišhalidović, born 1962), Bosnian singer-songwriter
 Dino Mikanović (born 1994), Croatian footballer
 Dino Minichiello (born 1968), Canadian fashion designer and entrepreneur
 Dino Molinaro, band member of Ikon
 Dino Monduzzi (1922-2006), Italian prelate of the Catholic Church
 Dino Moras (born 1944), French biochemist and research director
 Dino Morea (born 1975), Indian model and actor
 Dino Morelli (born 1973), former racing driver
 Dino Muric (born 1990), Slovenian professional basketball player
 Dino Nardin (1932–2010), Italian rower
 Dino Natali, American stage- and television actor
 Dino Ndlovu (born 1990), South African professional footballer
 Dino Pagliari (born 1957), Italian professional former footballer and manager
 Dino Patti Djalal (born 1965), former Indonesian Ambassador to the US
 Dino Pedriali (1950–2021), Italian photographer
 Dino Pedrone, American former President of Davis College
 Dino Perić (born 1994), Croatian professional footballer
 Dino Perrone Compagni (1879-1950), Italian fascist, military personnel, and politician
 Dino Philipson (1889–1972), Italian lawyer and politician 
 Dino Philyaw (born 1970), retired American professional football player
 Dino Piero Giarda (born 1936), Italian economist and academic
 Dino Pita (born 1988), Bosnian-Swedish basketball player
 Dino Pogolotti (1879-1923), Italian real estate entrepreneur
 Dino Pompanin (1930-2015), Italian alpine skier
 Dino Porrini (born 1953), Italian former cyclist
 Dino Quattrocecere (born 1973), South African figure skater
 Dino Rada (born 1967), Croatian former professional basketball player
 Dino Radončić (born 1999), Montenegrin professional basketball player
 Dino Radoš (born 1991), Croatian professional basketball player
 Dino Ramic (born 1988), American soccer player
 Dino Rešidbegović (born 1975), Bosnian contemporary classic/electronic/experimental music composer
 Dino Restelli (1924-2006), American professional baseball player
 Dino Reyes Chua (born 1980), Filipino businessman and politician
 Dino Risi (1916-2008), Italian film director
 Dino Rondani (1868-1951), Italian socialist politician, lawyer, and parliamentarian
 Dino Rora (1945-1966), Italian swimmer
 Dino Rossi (born 1959), American politician and businessman
 Dino Sani (born 1932), Brazilian former footballer and coach
 Dino Sanlorenzo (1930-2020), Italian politician
 Dino Santana (1940-2010), Brazilian actor
 Dino Šarac (born 1990), Serbian footballer
 Dino Sefir (born 1988), Ethiopian long-distance runner
 Dino Segre (1893-1975), Italian writer
 Dino Seremet (born 1980), retired Slovenian footballer
 Dino Sete Cordas (1918-2006), Brazilian guitar player
 Dino Sex, member of the American punk rock band the Murder Junkies
 Dino Shafeek (1930-1984), Bangladeshi-British comedy actor
 Dino Sinovcic (born 1992), Croatian Paralympic swimmer
 Dino Skender (born 1983), Croatian professional football manager
 Dino Skorup (born 1999), Croatian professional footballer
 Dino Slavić (born 1992), Croatian handball player
 Dino Sokolovic (born 1988), Croatian Paralympic alpine skier
 Dino Spadetto (born 1950), retired Italian professional footballer
 Dino Staffa (1906-1977), Italian Cardinal of the Roman Catholic Church
 Dino Stancic (born 1992), Slovenian footballer
 Dino Stecher (born 1964), Swiss ice hockey coach and former player
 Dino Stiglec (born 1990), Croatian professional footballer
 Dino Tadello (born 1954), former Italian mountain runner and masters athlete
 Dino Tavarone (born 1942), Italian-Canadian actor
 Dino Terragni (1927-1979), Italian entrepreneur and inventor
 Dino Toppmoller (born 1980), German football manager and former player
 Dino Toso (1969-2008), Italian-Dutch engineer
 Dino Turcato (born 1946), Italian weightlifter
 Dino Urbani (1882-1958), Italian fencer
 Dino Valls (born 1959), Spanish painter
 Dino Vasso (born 1987), American football coach
 Dino Verde (1922-2004), Italian author, lyricist, playwright, and screenwriter
 Dino Verzini (born 1943), retired Italian track cyclist
 Dino Visser (born 1989), South African footballer
 Dino Waldren (born 1991), American rugby union player
 Dino Wells (born 1970), American actor, writer, boxer, and filmmaker
 Dino Wieser (born 1989), Swiss professional ice hockey player
 Dino Williams (born 1990), Jamaican international footballer
 Dino Yannopoulos (1919-2003), Metropolitan Opera director
 Dino Zamparelli (born 1992), British racing driver
 Dino Zandegù (born 1940), Italian former cyclist
 Dino Zoff (born 1942), Italian former football goalkeeper
 Dino Zonić, Bosnian composer and conductor
 Dino Zucchi (1927-2011), Italian basketball player

Nickname

Dino is also a nickname for Agostino, Constantinos, Alfredino, etc.

 Dino (born 1999), stage name of Lee Chan, youngest member of K-pop boy group Seventeen (band)
 Dino De Laurentiis (1919-2010), Italian film producer
 Dino Armas (born 1941), Uruguayan theater director and writer
 Alfredo Ferrari (1932-1956), Italian automotive engineer, Enzo Ferrari's son
 Dino Saluzzi (born 1935), Argentine musician
 Dino Stamatopoulos (born 1964), American television comedy writer, actor, and producer
 Kevin Conner, better known as Dino, part of the R&B group H-Town
 Nickname of Dean Bandiera (1926-2020), Canadian footballer
 Nickname of Dean Martin (1917-1995), American singer, actor, and comedian
 Nickname of Dean Paul Martin (1951-1987), American singer and actor, Dean Martin's son
 Nickname of Sabahudin Bilalovic (1960-2003), Bosnian professional basketball player

Fictional characters
 Dino Ortolani, a character from the HBO drama series Oz
 Dino Zerilli, a character from the crime drama series The Sopranos
 Dino (The Flintstones), Fred and Wilma Flinstone's pet dinosaur

See also
 Dinos (disambiguation)
 Dino (surname)

Italian masculine given names
Lists of people by nickname
Croatian masculine given names
Bosnian masculine given names
Romanian masculine given names
Bulgarian masculine given names